Pilawa  is a town in Garwolin County, Masovian Voivodeship, Poland, with 4,121 inhabitants (2004), 59 km southeast of Warsaw. Previously it was situated in Siedlce Voivodeship (1975–1998).

Transport
Pilawa is an important railway junction, it is directly connected to many cities:
 Pilawa-Warsaw
 Pilawa-Dęblin-Lublin
 Pilawa-Mińsk Mazowiecki (inactive)
 Pilawa-Skierniewice (inactive)
 Pilawa-Łuków (inactive)

The Voivodeship road 805 runs through Pilawa, and its junction with the Expressway S17 is located 2 km east from the town.

Cities and towns in Masovian Voivodeship
Garwolin County
Masovian Voivodeship (1526–1795)
Siedlce Governorate
Lublin Governorate
Lublin Voivodeship (1919–1939)
Warsaw Voivodeship (1919–1939)